All Shook Up is the second full-length release from Melbourne-based singer-songwriter Sophie Koh. The album was produced by J. Walker from Machine Translations. It will be released in Australia and New Zealand on 9 August 2008. It features a song entirely in Chinese written by San Mao

Track listing
 "All Shook Up" – 3:27
 "In My World" – 3:03
 "He Found Out" – 3:02
 "Objects In This Mirror" – 3:55
 "Somebody Come To End This" – 3:47
 "Milk Song" – 2:57 
 "Gan Lan Shu (Olive Tree)" – 3:01
 "In Your Love" – 3:10
 "Superstar" – 2:57 
 "Threnody" – 3:22
 "All The Night" – 4:22

Personnel
Sophie Koh – vocals, backing vocals, acoustic guitar, bass, grand piano, keys, viola, accordion
J Walker – guitars, bass, electric guitars, viola, hand percussion, drums, effects, erhu
Ivan Jakic – bass
Phil Collings – drums
Tim Reid – Acoustic guitar
Caerwen Martin – cello

2008 albums
Sophie Koh albums